Tatla Lake is a freshwater lake in the West Chilcotin area of British Columbia, Canada, situated just east of the community of Tatla Lake, British Columbia. This long, narrow lake, known for good kokanee fishing, is part of the Fraser River drainage basin.

The long, skinny shape of the lake means that Tatla Lake has the second longest lake perimeter in the Chilcotin at 56 km (even though Charlotte Lake, Tatlayoko Lake, and Lower Taseko Lake have more surface area).

See also
Chilanko Forks

References

Lakes of the Chilcotin
Lakes of British Columbia
Range 2 Coast Land District